Sir Henry Askew KCB (7 May 1775 – 25 June 1847) was an officer of the British Army. He served during the Napoleonic Wars and fought at the Battle of Waterloo. He rose to the rank of lieutenant-general during his career.

Biography
Askew was born in 1775, the third son of John Askew of Pallinsburn House, Ford, Northumberland.

He joined the army in 1793 as an ensign in the 1st Foot. He served in the campaigns in Holland and Flanders in 1799, and then in the Walcheren Campaign in 1809. Askew took part in the Peninsular War and operations in the south of France, being commended with a medal for his part in the Battle of the Nive.

He was wounded at the Battle of Quatre Bras and received the Waterloo Medal. He was knighted in 1821 and became a lieutenant-general in 1837.

Askew died in 1847.

References

1775 births
1847 deaths
People from Ford, Northumberland
Military personnel from Northumberland
British Army lieutenant generals
Royal Scots officers
Knights Bachelor
Companions of the Order of the Bath
British Army personnel of the French Revolutionary Wars
British Army personnel of the Napoleonic Wars
British Army personnel of the Peninsular War
Recipients of the Waterloo Medal